Babalkan-e Olya (also Romanized as Bābalkān-e ‘Olyā; also known as Bābalkān-e Bālā and Bālā Bābalkān) is a village in Lalehabad Rural District, Lalehabad District, Babol County, Mazandaran Province, Iran. At the 2006 census, its population was 379, in 96 families.

References 

Populated places in Babol County